Johannes Theodor Schmalhausen (1849–1894) was a Russian botanist of German descent, known for his studies of East-European plants.

Early life and education
Johannes Theodor Schmalhausen was born in St Petersburg. His father was a librarian at the Russian Academy of Sciences.
After attending the Gymnasium, Schmalhausen studied botany at the University of St. Petersburg graduating with a magister degree in 1874. He was awarded the Gold Medal of the University for the botanical essay "On plant hybrids. Observations from St. Petersburg", was selected for a Professorial career and sent abroad from 1874 to 1876. He studied in Strasbourg (with Heinrich Anton de Bary and Andreas Franz Wilhelm Schimper), Zurich (with Oswald Heer), Vienna, Prague, Munich, Berlin, visited the Alps, Northern Italy and Southern France.

In 1877 he became a conservator at the herbarium of the Imperial Botanical Garden in Saint Petersburg and was ordained as a professor (Russian doctorate).

Career
From 1878 he was associate professor at Vladimir University of Kiev and later professor of botany.  For several years he was director of the botanical garden at the University of Kiev.

His youngest son was the evolutionary biologist Ivan Schmalhausen.

Legacy
The genus Schmalhausenia (family Asteraceae) is named in his honor.

Published works 
 Beiträge zur Kenntnis der Milchsaftbehälter der Pflanzen, 1877.
 Beiträge zur Jura-Flora Russlands, 1879.
 Beiträge zur Tertiärflora Süd-West-Russlands, 1883.
 Tertiäre Pflanzen der Insel Neusibirien, 1890.

References

External links 
 
 
 

1849 births
1894 deaths
Scientists from Saint Petersburg
Saint Petersburg State University alumni
19th-century German botanists
Academic staff of Saint Petersburg State University
Corresponding members of the Saint Petersburg Academy of Sciences
Academic staff of the Taras Shevchenko National University of Kyiv
Russian people of German descent